Jannion Anthony "Tony" Elliott (born 29 March 1944) is a former Australian politician. He was the National Party member for Cunningham in the Legislative Assembly of Queensland from 1974 to 2001.

Born in Toowoomba, Queensland, Elliott was a farmer, contractor and agricultural consultant before entering politics. Following his election in 1974, he served on various government committees until his appointment as Minister for Tourism, National Parks, Sport and the Arts in December 1980. Dropped from the ministry in 1983, he was Opposition Spokesman for Environment, Conservation and Heritage from 1990 to 1992. He did not serve on Rob Borbidge's front bench and spent his final term as Deputy Chairman of the Scrutiny of Legislation Committee. He retired at the 2001 state election. With his wife “Sally parkinson” his son “Jannion Kent Elliott” and his 3 daughters “Claire, Phoebe, and Lucy. His eldest daughter Claire is now known as Luna Sterling a recording and performing music artist. Lucy, Tony’s youngest daughter operates multiple sustainable and ethically orientated fashion boutiques in Mexico, named Nakawe Trading.

References

1944 births
Living people
Members of the Queensland Legislative Assembly
National Party of Australia members of the Parliament of Queensland
21st-century Australian politicians